St Mary Magdalene's Church is in Ribbleton Avenue, Ribbleton, Preston, Lancashire, England.  It is an active Anglican parish church in the deanery of Preston, the archdeaconry of Lancaster, and the diocese of Blackburn.  Its benefice is united with that of The Church of the Ascension, Ribbleton.

History
The church was built in 1888–91 to a design by R. Knill Freeman.  Additions were made to it in about 1901 by the Lancaster architects Austin and Paley, and again by the same architectural practice in 1938–41, with a new chancel, chapel, aisles and vestries.

Architecture
St Mary's is constructed in red sandstone with dressings in yellow sandstone.  It contains features in Decorated style.  Its plan includes short aisles, and transepts of two unequal bays.  Along the aisles are parapets hiding the roof.  There is a large rose windows in each transept.  The authors of the Buildings of England series describe it as "an odd building" that "was never finished".

See also

List of ecclesiastical works by Austin and Paley (1895–1914)
List of ecclesiastical works by Austin and Paley (1916–44)

References

Bibliography

 

Church of England church buildings in Lancashire
Gothic Revival church buildings in England
Gothic Revival architecture in Lancashire
Churches completed in 1941
Diocese of Blackburn
Austin and Paley buildings
Churches in Preston